The Sharp Nemesis NXT (which stands for "Neoteric experimental Technology") is a sport-class kit-built aircraft, designed for air racing. It was designed by Nemesis Air Racing's president Jon Sharp, as a follow-on to their Sharp Nemesis. It is a two-seat, single engine, low wing, retractable gear kit aircraft. As designed, the aircraft is powered by a Lycoming TIO-540-NXT Thunderbolt six-cylinder engine.

In 2011 the German company Air-C-Race became the official builder of RC models of the Nemesis NXT.

Racing history

Jon Sharp announced his retirement from Pylon Racing in August 2011, as the pilot with the highest number of wins in the history of racing. In 2015 he was invited to donate his prototype Nemesis NXT to the National Air and Space Museum, and it was delivered in 2018 by Crew Chief Steve Hill and race pilot Justin Phillipson. Museum directors planned to display it in their Nation of Speed gallery at the museum's central site, but when they realized it was too large to fit through that building's access door, they moved it to the Steven F. Udvar-Hazy Center in Fairfax County, Virginia, where it is on permanent display (as of 2022) in the Boeing Aviation Hangar alongside its older sibling, Nemesis.

Records

On 19 September 2009, the aircraft reached , the first homebuilt aircraft to exceed  average race speed on the Reno course.

He earned his 15th National Championship (another record) completing the "Record a Day and Two on Sunday" Reno campaign of 2009.

In September–October 2015 Sharp set five FAI records for piston aircraft at Moriarty, New Mexico; all are current in 2022:

 In the under-1000 kg weight class C1b, average 393 miles/hour for four 3-km runs at low altitude; and 406 miles/hour for two 15 km runs at unrestricted altitude
 In the under-1750 kg weight class C1c, average 415 miles/hr on the 3-km course, 407 miles/hr on the 15 km, and 397 miles/hr for a 100 km circuit.

Specifications

References

External links

 Nemesis Air Racing Official Web Site
 Relentless Air Racing 
 Reno Air Racing Association
 Specs
  "Air Racer: Chasing the Dream" documentary film
 Sport Class Air Racing Web Site

Homebuilt aircraft
Racing aircraft
Mojave Air and Space Port
2000s United States sport aircraft
Low-wing aircraft
Single-engined tractor aircraft
Aircraft first flown in 2004